The Bhutan women's national under-20 football team is the national under-20 team of Bhutan that represents the Bhutan in international football competitions including the SAFF U-18 Women's Championship, the AFC U-19 Women's Championship and the FIFA U-20 Women's World Cup, as well as any other under-20 international football tournaments. The team is governed by the Bhutan Football Federation and is a member of the Asian Football Confederation (AFC). The youth side play their home games at Changlimithang    Stadium in Thimphu alongside the senior team.

Home stadium 
The Bhutan women's national under-20 football team plays their home matches on the Changlimithang Stadium.

Players
 The following players were called up for 2021 SAFF U-19 Women's Championship.

Fixtures and results
legend

2021

2018

Competitive record

FIFA U-20 Women's World Cup

*Draws include knock-out matches decided on penalty kicks.

AFC U-20 Women's Asian Cup

*Draws include knock-out matches decided on penalty kicks.

AFC U-20 Women's Asian Cup qualification

SAFF U-18 Women's Championship

*Draws include knock-out matches decided on penalty kicks.

References

under-20
Asian women's national under-20 association football teams
under-20
Women's under-20